Köylü pastası ("peasant's cake") is a kurabiye or cake from Turkish cuisine. Köylü pastası is made with egg, flour, yogurt, and butter. 

Other common desserts of this style are Van pastası, Kars pastası, Kaşık pastası, Erzurum pastası.

See also 
 Kurabiye
 Muğla halkası

References 

Turkish cuisine
Turkish cakes